The American Entomological Society was founded on March 1, 1859. It is the oldest continuously operating entomology society in the Western Hemisphere, and one of the oldest scientific societies in the United States.  It is headquartered in Philadelphia, Pennsylvania.  The society publishes Entomological News, Transactions of the American Entomological Society, and Memoirs of the American Entomological Society.  It is not affiliated in any way with the similarly named Entomological Society of America.

See also
List of entomology journals

References

External links
American Entomological Society
Transactions of the American Entomological Society
Entomological News

Entomological societies
Learned societies of the United States
1859 establishments in the United States